The 3rd Engineer Battalion is a unit of the United States Army that deploys to designated contingency areas and conducts combat and/or stability operations in support of a brigade combat team. It is composed of two combat engineer companies, one signal, one military intelligence, and a headquarters company. Its mission is to provide assured mobility, counter-mobility, general engineering, survivability support, military intelligence, and connectivity support to deploy anywhere at any time.  The unit's history spans 1901 to present day.

Symbolism

The battalion's insignia was approved 11 February 1921, and it consists of a basic background, a white shield with the Roman numeral III and a splash of red with an indented border of gold. The crest that sits on the shield consists of a wreath of the same colors with a beaver crouched at the foot of a palm branch. The beaver is the symbol of New York and nature's engineer, the palm branch represents tropical service, the red and white are the engineer colors and the indented border alludes to the work of the engineers in field fortifications.

Unit history

The 3rd BEB was initially organized as the 3rd Battalion of Engineers, 25 March 1901, at Fort Totten, N.Y. The battalion was expanded August 1916 and reorganized as the 3rd Engineer Regiment with portions of it in the Philippines, Hawaii and Panama.

In April 1921, the regiment assembled in Hawaii and became the engineer component of the Hawaiian Division and the 3rd Engineers did most of the military construction on the Island of Oahu.

In July 1950 the battalion moved to Korea to serve in the Korean campaign with the 24th Infantry Division. 3rd Engineer battalion is responsible for improving most major thoroughfares and bridging most rivers in Korea. The battalion stayed in Korea until November 1953.

The 3rd Engineer Battalion was also assigned to the 24th Infantry Division at Ft. Stewart, Ga  it deployed with the division in 1990 for Operations Desert Shield/Desert Storm, as well as deployed with the 10th Mt division to Somalia in 1993.

The 3rd Engineer Battalion has also been to Bavaria, Germany, Lebanon, Poland, Finland, Bulgaria, Kuwait, Iraq, and Syria.

References

External links
 Official announcement of re-flagging ceremony
 The Institute of Heraldry: 3d EN BN, 3 ABCT, 1 CD

003